Rogovatoye is a rural locality (a selo) and the administrative center of Rogovatovskoye Rural Settlement, Starooskolsky District, Belgorod Oblast, Russia. The population was 3,001 as of 2010. There are 37 streets.

Geography 
Rogovatoye is located 47 km east of Stary Oskol (the district's administrative centre) by road. Dmitriyevsky is the nearest rural locality.

References

External links 
 Corpus of Rogovatka dialect

Rural localities in Starooskolsky District
Nizhnedevitsky Uyezd